In enzymology, a beta-L-arabinosidase is an enzyme that catalyzes the chemical reaction

a beta-L-arabinoside + H2O  L-arabinose + an alcohol

Thus, the two substrates of this enzyme are beta-L-arabinoside and H2O, whereas its two products are L-arabinose and alcohol.

This enzyme belongs to the family of hydrolases, specifically those glycosidases that hydrolyse O- and S-glycosyl compounds.  The systematic name of this enzyme class is beta-L-arabinoside arabinohydrolase. This enzyme is also called vicianosidase.

References 

 

EC 3.2.1
Enzymes of unknown structure